Mitchell was a major brass-era automobile marque in Racine, Wisconsin, from 1903 to 1923.

History 
Wisconsin Wheel Works was established in the 1890s by the wagon maker Mitchell & Lewis Company, Ltd. to manufacture bicycles and developed a motorcycle in 1900. The company began manufacturing automobiles in 1903 as the Mitchell Motor Car Company.

Motor Cars 
The company's first models were a chain driven and water-cooled four-stroke 4hp and two-stroke 7hp runabout, with tiller steering and a two-speed planetary transmission. The cars were designed by John W. Bates, a Chicago engineer.  1904 brought air-cooling and the addition of a four-cylinder model . By 1907 four-cylinders only were produced, improved with shaft drive on all models and all engines water-cooled.  Mitchell participated in many automobile contests to show the power and reliability of their new four-cylinder cars. 

William T. Lewis retired in 1910 and William M. Lewis took over. The wagon business and automobile company were combined into Mitchell-Lewis Motor Company. The 1910 line of Mitchell's included two four-cylinder models and a new six-cylinder model was introduced. The Mitchell engines were cast in pairs with three-bearing crankshafts on the fours and five-bearing crankshafts on the six-cylinders.

Growth 
Mitchell built virtually all of the components for their cars, and the company enjoyed a reputation as a quality builder of medium-priced cars.  Mitchell annual production was growing steadily from 82 cars in 1904 to 1,377 in 1907, 2,946 in 1909, 5,614 in 1910 and to just over 6,000 in 1912.  This made them the leading car maker in Wisconsin. A small production of trucks and buses were run from 1905 to1908. Pricing in 1912 ran from a runabout at $950 to a limousine at $2,250 and Mitchell would remain in this mid-price market.

French engineer Rene Petard was imported to design a new series of T- head engines which were introduced for the 1913 model year. These were called "The American built French car" in advertisements. Financial issues in 1913 caused the retirement of William Mitchell Lewis from the company and with Rene Petard, he started a new company to produce a car called the Lewis. A banker, Joseph Winterbottom, Jr. became president of Mitchell-Lewis.

Major Manufacturer 
The firm was reorganized as Mitchell Motors Company, Inc. in 1916 and Mitchell sales manager Otis Friend took over the presidency. Sales in 1917 reached a record 10,938. Otis Friend left in 1918 and subsequently built a car of his own called the Friend in Pontiac, Michigan. A General Electric executive named D.C. Durland was appointed as the new president.

In 1916 the four-cylinder Mitchell was dropped, and a V-8 was built that year, but from 1917 only six-cylinder cars were produced. The Mitchell introduced in 1920 had a sloping radiator configuration and was given the epithet of "drunken Mitchell.” This styling mistake hurt sales. In 1922 a million-mile test was done by 109 Mitchell “White Streaks” which resulted in good publicity.

Fate 
With the effects of styling mistakes, competition from mass producers of automobiles and the post-war depression, output had plummeted to less than 2,500 in both 1920 and 1921. Mitchell Motors Company, Inc. filed for bankruptcy in June 1923. Sales of unfinished automobiles and raw materials continued into 1924. In February 1924 the Mitchell factory was sold to Nash Motors and the Ajax automobile would be produced there.

Gallery

See also
The Mitchell Lewis Building at 815 Eighth Street in Racine was added to the National Register of Historic Places on April 20, 2005. The Racine architectural firm of Guilbert & Funston is credited with designing the building.
The Mitchell House at 905 South Main Street was owned by Henry Mitchell of the Mitchell Wagon works and was designed by Cecil Corwin.
Mitchell Automobiles at ConceptCarz

Mitchell Classic Cars information and images
Salisbury Commons Schedule of Events, 2010 Images of several early Mitchell cars on page 10-13 of the pdf.
List of defunct United States automobile manufacturers
Brass Era car

References

1900s cars
1910s cars
1920s cars
Defunct motor vehicle manufacturers of the United States
Companies based in Racine, Wisconsin
Brass Era vehicles
Vintage vehicles
Veteran vehicles
Motor vehicle manufacturers based in Wisconsin
Cars introduced in 1903
Vehicle manufacturing companies established in 1903
Vehicle manufacturing companies disestablished in 1923